In Hindu philosophy, turiya (Sanskrit: तुरीय, meaning "the fourth") or chaturiya, chaturtha, is pure consciousness. Turiya is the background that underlies and pervades the three common states of consciousness.  The three common states of consciousness are: waking state, dreaming state, and dreamless deep sleep.

Mandukya Upanishad

Turiya is discussed in Verse 7 of the Mandukya Upanishad; however, the idea is found in the oldest Upanishads. For example, Chapters 8.7 through 8.12 of Chandogya Upanishad discuss the "four states of consciousness" as awake, dream-filled sleep, deep sleep, and beyond deep sleep. Similarly, Brihadaranyaka Upanishad, in chapter 5.14.3 discusses Turiya state, as does Maitri Upanishad in sections 6.19 and 7.11.

Verse VII of the Mandukya Upanishad describes Turiya:

The insight during meditation of Turiya is known as amātra, the 'immeasurable' or 'measureless' in the Mandukya Upanishad, being synonymous with samādhi in Yoga terminology.

Understanding of Turiya

Advaita Vedanta

Advaita posits three states of consciousness, namely waking (jagrat), dreaming (svapna), deep sleep (suṣupti), which are empirically experienced by human beings, and correspond to the Three Bodies Doctrine:
 The first state is the waking state, in which we are aware of our daily world. This is the gross body.
 The second state is the dreaming mind. This is the subtle body.
 The third state is the state of deep sleep. This is the causal body.

Advaita also posits the fourth state of Turiya, which some describe as pure consciousness, the background that underlies and transcends these three common states of consciousness. Turiya is the state of liberation, where according to the Advaita school, one experiences the infinite (ananta) and non-different (advaita/abheda), that is free from the dualistic experience, the state in which ajativada, non-origination, is apprehended. According to Candradhara Sarma, Turiya state is where the foundational Self is realized, it is measureless, neither cause nor effect, all pervading, without suffering, blissful, changeless, self-luminous, real, immanent in all things and transcendent. Those who have experienced the Turiya stage of self-consciousness have reached the pure awareness of their own non-dual Self as one with everyone and everything, for them the knowledge, the knower, the known becomes one, they are the Jivanmukta.

Advaita traces the foundation of this ontological theory in more ancient Sanskrit texts. For example, chapters 8.7 through 8.12 of Chandogya Upanishad discuss the "four states of consciousness" as awake, dream-filled sleep, deep sleep, and beyond deep sleep. One of the earliest mentions of Turiya, in the Hindu scriptures, occurs in verse 5.14.3 of the Brihadaranyaka Upanishad. The idea is also discussed in other early Upanishads.

Gaudapada

Gaudapada (ca. 7th century) was an early guru in the Advaita Vedanta. Gaudapada is traditionally said to have been the grand-guru of the great teacher, Adi Shankara, one of the most important figures in Hindu philosophy.

In this work, Gaudapada deals with perception, idealism, causality, truth, and reality. The fourth state, (turīya avasthā), corresponds to silence, as the other three correspond to AUM. It is the substratum of the other three states. It is, states Nakamura, atyanta-shunyata (absolute emptiness).

Michael Comans disagrees with Nakamura's thesis that "the fourth realm (caturtha) was perhaps influenced by the Sunyata of Mahayana Buddhism." According to Comans,

Comans further refers to Nakamura himself, who notes that later Mahayana sutras such as the Laṅkāvatāra Sūtra and the concept of Buddha-nature, were influenced by Vedantic thought. Comans concludes that

Isaeva states that there are differences in the teachings in the texts of Buddhism and the Mandukya Upanishad of Hinduism, because the latter asserts that citta "consciousness" is identical with the eternal and immutable atman "soul, self" of the Upanishads. In other words, Mandukya Upanishad and Gaudapada affirm the soul exists, while Buddhist schools affirm that there is no soul or self.

Adi Shankara
Adi Shankara described, on the basis of the ideas propounded in the Mandukya Upanishad, the three states of consciousness, namely waking (jågrata), dreaming (svapna), and deep
sleep (susupti),<ref group=web name=Om>[http://www.advaita.org.uk/discourses/downloads/om.pdf advaita.org.uk, ‘Om’ – three states and one reality (An interpretation of the Mandukya Upanishad)]</ref> which correspond to the three bodies:
 The first state is that of waking consciousness, in which we are aware of our daily world. "It is described as outward-knowing (bahish-prajnya), gross (sthula) and universal (vaishvanara)". This is the gross body.
 The second state is that of the dreaming mind. "It is described as inward-knowing (antah-prajnya), subtle (pravivikta), and burning (taijasa)". This is the subtle body.
 The third state is the state of deep sleep. In this state, the underlying ground of consciousness is undistracted. "[T]he Lord of all (sarv’-eshvara), the knower of all (sarva-jnya), the inner controller (antar-yami), the source of all (yonih sarvasya), the origin and dissolution of created things (prabhav-apyayau hi bhutanam)". This is the causal body.

In the waking consciousness, there is a sense of 'I' (self-identity) and awareness of thoughts. In the sleep or dream state, there is no or little sense of 'I'; however, there are thoughts and the awareness of thoughts. Waking and dreaming are not true experiences of Absolute Reality and metaphysical truth, because of their dualistic natures of subject and object, self and not-self, ego, and non-ego.

Kashmir Shaivism

Kashmir Shaivism holds the state called turya – the fourth state. It is neither wakefulness, dreaming, nor deep sleep. In reality, it exists in the junction between any of these three states, i.e. between waking and dreaming, between dreaming and deep sleep, and between deep sleep and waking. In Kashmir Shaivism there exists a fifth state of consciousness called Turiyatita -  the state beyond Turiya.'' Turiyatita, also called the void or shunya 
is the state where one attains liberation otherwise known as jivanmukti or moksha.

Based on the Tantraloka an extended model of seven consecutive stages of turiya is presented by Swami Lakshman Joo. These stages are called:
 Nijānanda
 Nirānanda
 Parānanda
 Brahmānanda
 Mahānanda
 Chidānanda
 Jagadānanda
While turiya stages 1 - 6 are attributed to the "internal subjective samādhi" (nimīlanā samādhi), once samādhi becomes permanently established in the seventh turiya stage it is described to span not only the internal subjective world anymore but beyond that also the whole external objective world (unimīlanā samādhi).

See also

Hinduism
 Brahma Samhita
 Rasa (theology)
 Rasa lila
 Samādhi
 Shuddhadvaita
Buddhism
 Mindfulness
 Dhyana in Buddhism
 Shikan-taza
 Mahamudra
 Dzogchen
 Sunyata
 Buddha-nature
 Two truths doctrine
Cross-over
 Choiceless awareness
Therapy
 Morita therapy
 Gestalt therapy
 Acceptance and commitment therapy

Notes

References

Published references

Web-references

Sources

 
  Some editions spell the author Isayeva.
 
 
 
  
 
 
 

Hindu philosophical concepts
Vaishnavism
Nondualism
Advaita Vedanta